Shahpur is a town and a notified area in Bhojpur district in the Indian state of Bihar.

Geography
It has an average elevation of 51 metres (167 feet).

Demographics

As of the 2011 Indian Census, Shahpur had a total population of 17,767, of which 9,182 were males and 8,585 were females. Population within the age group of 0 to 6 years was 2,809. The total number of literates in Shahpur was 10,521, which constituted 59.2% of the population with male literacy of 67.9% and female literacy of 49.9%. The effective literacy rate of 7+ population of Shahpur was 70.3%, of which male literacy rate was 80.7% and female literacy rate was 59.3%. The Scheduled Castes and Scheduled Tribes population was 2,348 and 135 respectively. Shahpur had  2734 households in 2011.

 India census, Shahpur had a population of 14,456. Males constitute 52% of the population and females 48%. Shahpur has an average literacy rate of 47%, lower than the national average of 59.5%: male literacy is 58%, and female literacy is 34%. In Shahpur, 19% of the population is under 6 years of age.

Administration 
The Shahpur assembly constituency covers Shahpur community development block; and Ishwarpura, Sarna, Suhinya, Barishwan, Chamarpur, Govindpur Tola,  Belwati, Maharja, Kundeshar,  Karisath, Semariya, hariharpur, sonbarasa, Beheya, chaurasta, Itawa, Bharauli, Gopalpur, Ranisagar, Karnamepur, Ramdthi, Banahi, Baghi, Diha, Gaura, Sikariya, Maniyara, Dhamwal and Kauria.

This town is alternatively spelled as Shahpurpatti. The town comes between Ara and Buxar National Highway no.84.

Villages 
Shahpur block contains the following 137 villages:

Utilities 
As of 2011, Shahpur has one of three rural power substations in Bhojpur district, with the other two being at Koilwar and Bihiya.

Notable places
This city is known as "Town Of Temples". "Mahavira Sthan", "Kundeswar Dham" "kudwa shiv at Gosainpur" "Gharghbarni mai" are some of the major temples. It is considered to be very holy for Hindus and the temple compound hosts a number of fairs.

Notable people 

 Avinash Chandra Vidyarthi, Bhojpuri Poet

References

See also

Cities and towns in Bhojpur district, India